Several ships of the French Navy have borne the name Content:
Content (1672), hulked in 1685.
Content (1695), sold for breaking up in 1712.
Content (1717), sold in 1747.
Content (1747), captured in 1793 at Toulon and burnt.

French Navy ship names